The 2021 Milan Ciga Vasojević Cup is the 15th season of the Serbian women's national basketball cup tournament.,

The tournament was held in Vršac from 13 to 14 March 2021. Art Basket won the tournament.

Qualified teams

Venue

Bracket

Semifinals

Vojvodina 021 v Crvena zvezda Kombank

Art Basket v Radivoj Korać

Final

See also
2020–21 First Women's Basketball League of Serbia
2020–21 Radivoj Korać Cup

References

External links
 Official website 

Milan Ciga Vasojević Cup
Basketball
Serbia